Firdovsi Farzaliyev (born 10 July 1993) is an Azerbaijani karateka. He won the gold medal in the men's kumite 60 kg event at the 2015 European Games held in Baku, Azerbaijan and at the 2017 World Games held in Wrocław, Poland. He also won one of the bronze medals in this event at the 2016 World Karate Championships held in Linz, Austria.

He represented Azerbaijan at the 2020 Summer Olympics in Tokyo, Japan. He competed in the men's 67 kg event where he did not advance to compete in the semifinals.

Career 

He won the gold medal in the men's kumite 60 kg event at the 2017 World Games held in Wrocław, Poland. In the final, he defeated Amir Mehdizadeh of Iran.

In 2019, he won the silver medal in the men's kumite 60 kg event at the European Games held in Minsk, Belarus.

He qualified at the World Olympic Qualification Tournament in Paris, France to represent Azerbaijan at the 2020 Summer Olympics in Tokyo, Japan.

Achievements

References

External links 

 
 

Living people
1993 births
Place of birth missing (living people)
Azerbaijani male karateka
European Games gold medalists for Azerbaijan
European Games silver medalists for Azerbaijan
Karateka at the 2015 European Games
Karateka at the 2019 European Games
European Games medalists in karate
Competitors at the 2017 World Games
World Games medalists in karate
World Games gold medalists
Islamic Solidarity Games medalists in karate
Karateka at the 2020 Summer Olympics
Olympic karateka of Azerbaijan
Islamic Solidarity Games competitors for Azerbaijan
21st-century Azerbaijani people